Cusk may refer to:

 Cusk (fish), a fish of the northern Atlantic Ocean in the genus Brosme
 USS Cusk (SS-348), a submarine
 Burbot, a fish of the northern polar oceans in the genus Lota
 One of various species of fish in the cusk eel family